The Sunset Limited is a 2011 American television film directed by and starring Tommy Lee Jones. The film co-stars Samuel L. Jackson. It was the duo's second collaboration, after the 2000 film Rules of Engagement. The screenplay was written by Cormac McCarthy, based on his 2006 play of the same name.

The film is about the relationship between a Christian Black man who has a positive view of life and a nihilistic white man with a very negative view.

The film received generally favorable reviews.

Plot
Black and White converse about White's attempted suicide. White feels as though everything ends up in death, and that his life is minuscule in the throes of time.

From White's point of view, no matter how great someone or something is, all that is created eventually fades away. This is the opposite of what Black believes. He believes that there is a God and that we all must go through the troubles of life to get to paradise (Heaven). By his own account, his story is that of a man who has committed murder and was far away from God, but has now changed.

Black feels that he can dissuade White from committing suicide. With Black stopping White right before he was about to kill himself, Black feels that this is destiny. In the end, Black is not able to dissuade White from suicide; he lets him leave the apartment. When White leaves, Black is left pondering why God would put him in a position to save this man's life knowing that there is nothing that he can do to stop White from going through with the suicide.

Cast
 Samuel L. Jackson as Black 
 Tommy Lee Jones as White

Reception
On the review aggregator website Rotten Tomatoes, the film has a 68% approval rating based on reviews from 28 critics. The website's consensus reads, "The Sunset Limiteds ambition is undercut by arch dialogue and a claustrophobic setting, but Tommy Lee Jones and Samuel L. Jackson's dueling performances bring heft to this battle of wills." On Metacritic, it has a score of 67 out of 100 based on reviews from 15 critics, indicating "generally favorable reviews".

Verne Gay of Newsday praised the film and called it "grim, but a chance to see two magnificent actors at the peak of their powers." Mike Scott of The Times-Picayune called the film "A thinking man's drama that rolls deep, heavy thoughts around and around, trying to puzzle out where the truth lies. Or, indeed, if what we see as the truth is just that: a lie."

References

External links
 

2011 television films
2011 films
Films about suicide
Films about philosophy
Films about Christianity
American films based on plays
Films directed by Tommy Lee Jones
HBO Films films
Films scored by Marco Beltrami
Films based on works by Cormac McCarthy
Films with screenplays by Cormac McCarthy
Two-handers
2010s English-language films